The 2015 Star World Championships were held in Buenos Aires, Argentina November 01-10, 2015.

Results

References
 Results

External links
 

Star World Championships
Star World Championships
Sailing competitions in Argentina
 Sports competitions in Buenos Aires